Kabar, also known as Tarcal 10, is a crossing of Hárslevelű and Bouvier and was authorised for production in the Tokaj-Hegyalja region of Hungary in 2006. With a relatively low yield, it ripens early, produces high sugar and is prone to botrytis. Due to its thick skin, it is fairly resistant to late autumn rains.

References

White wine grape varieties
Grape varieties of Hungary